Sarah Moffat (born Clémence Moffat; July 1882 –Unknown), also known as Sarah Delice and Clémence Dumas, is a fictional character in the ITV drama Upstairs, Downstairs and its spin-off Thomas & Sarah. She was portrayed by Pauline Collins.

Early life
Sarah was the daughter of Albert Moffat and Marianne Dumas, who said she was the granddaughter of Alexandre Dumas, she was baptized as Clémence Moffat. Her parents met at the Theatre Royal in 1879, and Clémence was conceived about three months before her parents' marriage and born in July 1882. She had two younger siblings, a brother Charlie, who was born in 1887, and a sister named Sophia. Charlie, whom she had to spend much time in her childhood looking after due to his ill health, died in the final days of 1899; and Sophia later married. At the age of 6, she first went on the stage with the help of Agnes Hewitt, the manager of the Olympic Theatre in Drury Lane and earned three shillings a week. Her father, who was let go from many jobs due to drunkenness, died after being run over by an omnibus when Clémence was 15. Her mother committed suicide days later, and they were buried in a double funeral.

Clémence soon got work at a tailor's shop, but when a male member of staff tried to assault her, she was rescued by a pastor, and then went to work at his Hope Mission for a year. She left there in 1900, after the pastor, Martin Blackwood, offered her marriage and wanted her to beat him. After wandering the streets of London trying to find somewhere to stay, she caught pneumonia and was taken in by a spiritualist medium called Lydia Pagenell, who lived in Bloomsbury. She worked as Miss Pagenell's assistant for three and a half years until someone reported them for fraud, and they were both sent to Holloway Prison in October 1903. Miss Pagenell died weeks later in prison, while Clémence was released on 1 November. She went to Pratt's, an agency for domestic servants, who sent her to Eaton Place.

Eaton Place

Early days
When she arrived at 165, Eaton Place, she rang the front doorbell, instead of going to the servants' entrance. Moments later, in the morning room, she was being interviewed by Lady Marjorie. Lady Marjorie said Clémence was "not a servant's name" and renamed her 'Sarah'. Sarah had problems fitting into service as an under-house parlor maid, and within her first week stole, from the kitchen. When Hudson and Mrs. Bridges made her write out a passage from the Bible, she was forced to reveal she was illiterate. She quickly struck up a friendship with head house parlor maid, Rose. The footman Alfred Harris made unwanted romantic advances to Sarah, but she was frightened by his manner, and distanced herself from him.

In June 1904, Richard Bellamy commissioned a painter, Guthrie Scone, to paint his wife. Sarah was sent to deliver Lady Marjorie's dresses to his studio, and soon Scone was painting her as well, lying in bed. When both paintings were exhibited together as "The Mistress and the Maids", Sarah and Rose in their bedroom, whom Scone painted from Sarah's descriptions, half naked, were nearly sacked, but Scone persuaded Richard to keep them on. Two months later, in August, while the family and senior servants were away, the junior servants all dressed up as the family. This ended in disaster when James came back and found them all in the morning room. After this Sarah, annoyed by James's high-handed attitude, left Eaton Place.

Discovery in Whitechapel
In 1908, Sarah was discovered starving and destitute in a soup kitchen in Whitechapel by Elizabeth and James. Elizabeth insisted on taking Sarah back to Eaton Place and installed her as scullery maid, the only vacant position. Sarah was not happy with this, and determined to become under house parlourmaid again, managed to upset Alice (the under-house parlor maid) so she left, and Sarah became under house parlor maid. However, her second stint at Eaton Place didn't last long. In October 1908, she was set up by Thorkil Kraft, the batman of a Swedish Captain staying at Eaton Place, and was framed for theft, and left.

Sarah then began her stage career, as the music hall entertainer Clémence Dumas, who was also known as Sarah Delice, and was known for saucy songs like "What Are We Going to Do with Uncle Arthur?". At about the same time, she started an affair with James Bellamy, which included their going to Paris for a weekend. Much to everyone's surprise, she turned up at Elizabeth's wedding, apparently at James's invitation, and at the reception Hudson through gritted teeth had to call her "Miss".

Pregnancy

Sarah and James's affair came to a head when Sarah became pregnant, telling James she was expecting a "little Captain". This, along with James's considerable debts, meant he had to tell his parents. The family solicitor, Sir Geoffrey Dillon, arranged for Sarah to stay in a cottage on the Southwold Estate. The child was to be educated, and Sarah found local work. James was sent to India.

However, she found Southwold too boring, and ran away to Eaton Place, turning up the evening the King was dining upstairs in early 1909. She gave birth the same evening, but the baby boy died minutes after birth. Sarah was then given light work around the house, and after Elizabeth gave birth, she became Baby Lucy's nursery maid.

Thomas Watkins

From the moment Thomas Watkins came to Eaton Place in December 1909, he and Sarah quickly became close. The Welsh Thomas had been employed as manservant to Lawrence Kirbridge, and always had ambitions above domestic service. When the Kirbridges separated, Lawrence offered to take him around the world as his manservant, but Thomas instead decided to come to Eaton Place as chauffeur. He and Sarah joined forces to defeat an Irishman who was trying to blackmail the Bellamys, and this closeness resulted in Sarah's second pregnancy. Sarah insisted to the other servants that it was a gentleman who assaulted her while she sheltered from the rain. Thomas then offered marriage to solve the problem, and went to Richard Bellamy to ask permission. He liked the idea, as it would solve many problems, and gave Thomas £500 to start his own garage. Thomas and Sarah then left service. They returned to visit the servants and to give Lady Marjorie a birthday present, on 6 May 1910. The subsequent celebration downstairs ended when the news of Edward VII's death broke.

Life away from service

When they left service, Thomas and Sarah went their separate ways. Sarah gave birth at an aunt's house in the East End to a girl, who died at about an hour old. Soon after this, Thomas and Sarah got back together, although they never married. They began by trying at the garage business, but when this failed they tried many different schemes to make money, and even had servants of their own for a short time after Thomas won on a gamble. Thomas and Sarah were later forced back into service in the employ of Richard de Brassey, an eccentric man. Sarah and Richard had an affair, but when Thomas became trapped in a burning stable Richard attempted to save him and the stable collapsed. Richard died in the fire, while Thomas survived.

Footnotes

References
Mollie Hardwick, Sarah's Story, Sphere Books Limited, 1973
Mollie Hardwick, Thomas & Sarah, Sphere Books Limited, 1978

Upstairs, Downstairs characters
Fictional maids